Caritohallex is a monotypic genus of centipede with only one species, Caritohallex minyrrhopus. It is found in Panama. The original description of this species is based on a male holotype measuring about 10 mm in length with 39 pairs of legs and a female paratype measuring 8 mm in length with 43 leg pairs.

References 

Ballophilidae
Monotypic arthropod genera